Puncak Jalil (formerly known as Bandar Seri Bukit Jalil) is an 801 acres (3.2 km²) township in Seri Kembangan, Selangor, Malaysia. It is situated near the Technology Park Malaysia along the Puchong-Sungai Besi Highway Federal Route 217 and south of the National Sports Complex.

The Maju Expressway runs through the eastern boundary of the project.

Adjacent townships include Kinrara to the northwest, Lestari Perdana to the southeast and Taman Equine to the south.

The development, which is undertaken by Maxisegar Sdn Bhd, a wholly owned subsidiary of Talam, is an integrated and self-contained township comprising 11,651 units of residential and commercial properties.

The Gross Development Value of Puncak Jalil is estimated to be about RM2.5 billion with an expected development period of eight years.

The project was first launched in June 2001.

In 2006, IJM Berhad has agreed to step in to assist the ailing Talam Berhad to revive this project.  Beautiful landscaping works are currently in progress and this town would have potential growths as it is situated right between Malaysia's new administrative capital city, Putrajaya, with the old administrative capital city, Kuala Lumpur.

The project has wielded various controversies, notably the environmental damage done to the area (including the destruction of a lake with a natural island), the coercive relocation of native Orang Asli settlements and the general failure of the entire project (less than half of the completed housing areas are occupied).

The SMK Bandar Puncak Jalil school was opened in 2016.

External links 
 Talam
 Puncak-Jalil.com, online Community
 http://www.puncak-jalil.com/forums for their very active forum
 https://www.facebook.com/groups/tamanpuncakjalil.tpj/, in Facebook

Townships in Selangor